Chiloglottis chlorantha, commonly known as the Wollongong bird orchid, is a species of orchid endemic to a small part of New South Wales. It has two broad leaves and a single green to yellowish green flower with about twelve reddish, yellowish or bright green glands on the labellum callus.

Description
Flowering occurs in September and October.

Taxonomy and naming
Chiloglottis chlorantha was first formally described in 1991 by David Jones from a specimen collected near Wollongong and the description was publish in Australian Orchid Research. The specific epithet (chlorantha) is derived from the Ancient Greek words chloros meaning "green" and anthos meaning "flower", referring to the colour of the flower of this orchid.

Distribution and habitat
The Wollongong bird orchid grows on moist, sheltered slopes under shrubs mainly from near Sydney to the New England.

References

External links 

chlorantha
Orchids of New South Wales
Flora of New South Wales
Plants described in 1991